Mirnes Pepić (born 19 December 1995) is a Montenegrin professional footballer who plays as an attacking midfielder for the 3. Liga club SV Meppen.

Club career
After several years in the 2. Bundesliga and 3. Liga, he moved to MSV Duisburg in the summer of 2020. On 26 May 2021, it was announced that he would leave Duisburg at the end of the 2020–21 season. In August 2021, he signed for the Würzburger Kickers.

Pepić joined 3. Liga club SV Meppen following Würzburger Kickers' relegation to the Regionalliga Bayern in the 2021–22 season. He signed a one-year contract on 1 August 2022.

International career
Pepić has played for U18, U19 and U21 youth teams of Montenegro. In 2015, he made his debut for Montenegro U21.

Career statistics

References

External links

1995 births
Living people
Footballers from Podgorica
Association football midfielders
Montenegrin footballers
Montenegro youth international footballers
Montenegro under-21 international footballers
SSV Reutlingen 05 players
SC Paderborn 07 players
FC Erzgebirge Aue players
FC Hansa Rostock players
MSV Duisburg players
Würzburger Kickers players
SV Meppen players
Oberliga (football) players
2. Bundesliga players
Bundesliga players
3. Liga players
Montenegrin expatriate footballers
Expatriate footballers in Germany
Montenegrin expatriate sportspeople in Germany